Drowning as a method of execution is attested very early in history, for a large variety of cultures and as the method of execution for many types of offences.

Prohibition on shedding royal blood
In a variety of cultures, taboos against shedding the blood of royals are attested, and in many cultures, when the execution of a king or members of the royal family was thought necessary, they were drowned to avoid the spilling of blood. In Cambodia, for example, drowning was the type of execution reserved for members of the royal family. Felix Carey, missionary in Burma 1806–1812, describes the process as follows:

In another Eastern Asian country, the Kingdom of Assam, it was a royal privilege to execute people by shedding their blood; lower courts of justice could only order death by drowning, death by cudgelling in the head of the condemned and so on.

Within Islamic cultures as well, some examples exist that the royal person, or members of the royal family ought not be executed by means of bloodshed, or members of similarly highly respected families. For example, in the former Sultanate of Pattani, in nowadays southern Thailand one rebel, Tuk Mir, was drowned in the sea, out of respect for his recognized status as Syed, that is, a direct descendant of the family of the Prophet Muhammad. Within the Ottoman Empire, it became, for some time, a practice to execute the brothers of the chosen sultan in order to prevent political succession crises; but these members of the royal family were typically strangled or drowned, so that their blood would not be shed.

The reluctance to shed the king's blood is also attested within a number of African cultures. In his "The Golden Bough", James Frazer refers to this custom of drowning royal offenders instead both among the Ashanti people (in present-day Ghana and the Ivory Coast) and in the kingdom of Dahomey (in present-day Benin). Frazer also provides a number of other examples of executions of royals such that blood would not be shed, for example by means of strangling, starving or burning to death the royal personage.

Dissolution of practice
In Europe, some cases regarded as the last instances of drowning occurred during the latter half of the 16th century. The reported last cases in Esslingen and Württemberg, for example, occurred in 1589 and 1593, respectively. 1562, in Rothenburg, a woman was drowned for infanticide, but from the statistics provided in the source, this was the last such case; later on, women found guilty of infanticide were beheaded here. In 1580 Nuremberg, the executioner Franz Schmidt (who left a diary over his professional career from 1573-1617), used his influence to abolish the penalty of drowning, convincing the authorities to use hanging or beheading instead. Within Scotland and German areas, however, the 17th century is regarded as the time when this executional practice began to fade out in favour of beheading, while cases are still found well into the 18th century. The last case in Frankfurt am Main is said to have occurred in 1613.  In Großenhain, the last woman to be drowned occurred in 1622, and the punishment was replaced by beheading, or being broken on the wheel. In Quedlinburg, a woman was drowned in 1667 for killing her infant; just 6 years later, a similarly guilty woman was beheaded there on the market place instead. In Switzerland, the last case of judicial drowning occurred in 1652. In Russia, the practice seems to have been abolished in the early 18th century, whereas on Iceland, the last case of judicial drowning is said to have taken place in 1776.

Recent examples
In a recent example, the unrecognized Islamic State of Iraq and the Levant executed captured Iraqi prisoners by drowning them in a cage in June 2015. A video of the event was circulated on the Internet.

See also
 Bog body 
 Poena cullei
 Republican marriage
 Drownings at Nantes
 Drowning-pit

References

Bibliography 
 

 

Execution methods